Year 1479 (MCDLXXIX) was a common year starting on Friday (link will display the full calendar) of the Julian calendar).

Events 
 January–December 
 January 20 – Ferdinand II ascends the throne of Aragon, and rules together with his wife Isabella I, Queen of Castile, over most of the Iberian peninsula.
 January 25 – The Treaty of Constantinople is signed between the Ottoman Empire and Republic of Venice; Venice will cede Argo, Negroponte, Lemnos and Shkodër, and pay an annual tribute of 10,000 golden ducats.
 April 25 – Ratification of the Treaty of Constantinople in Venice ends the Siege of Shkodra after fifteen months, and brings all of Albania under the Ottoman Empire.
 May 13 – Christopher Columbus, an experienced mariner and successful trader in the thriving Genoese expatriate community in Portugal, marries Felipa Perestrelo Moniz (Italian on her father's side), and receives as dowry her late father's maps and papers, charting the seas and winds around the Madeira Islands, and other Portuguese possessions in the Ocean Sea.
 August 7 – Battle of Guinegate: A French army sent to invade the Netherlands is defeated by Maximilian of Austria.
 September 4 – The Treaty of Alcáçovas (also known as the Treaty or Peace of Alcáçovas-Toledo) is signed between the Catholic Monarchs of Castile and Aragon on one side, and the King of Portugal and his son on the other side, ending the four-year War of the Castilian Succession.
 October 13 – Battle of Breadfield: The army of the Kingdom of Hungary, led by Pál Kinizsi and István Báthory, defeats that of the Ottoman Empire in Transylvania, Hungary, leaving at least 10,000 Turkish dead.

 Ongoing 
 The plague breaks out in Florence.
 Johann Neumeister prints a new edition of Juan de Torquemada's Meditations, or the Contemplations of the Most Devout.

Births 
 March 12 – Giuliano de' Medici, Duke of Nemours (d. 1516)
 March 13 – Lazarus Spengler, German hymnwriter (d. 1534)
 March 20 – Ippolito d'Este, Italian Catholic cardinal (d. 1520)
 March 25 – Vasili III of Russia, Grand Prince of Moscow (d. 1533)
 May 3 – Henry V, Duke of Mecklenburg (d. 1552)
 May 5 – Guru Amar Das, third Sikh Guru (d. 1574)
 May 12 – Pompeo Colonna, Italian Catholic cardinal (d. 1532)
 June 14 – Giglio Gregorio Giraldi, Italian scholar and poet (d. 1552)
 June 15 – Lisa del Giocondo, Florentine noblewoman believed to be the subject of the Mona Lisa (d. 1542)
 August 14 – Catherine of York, English princess, aunt of Henry VIII (d. 1527)
 September 17 – Celio Calcagnini, Italian astronomer (d. 1541)
 October 28 – John Gage, English courtier of the Tudor period (d. 1556)
 November 6
 Joanna of Castile, Queen of Philip I of Castile, daughter of Isabella I of Castile and Ferdinand II of Aragon (d. 1555)
 Philip I, Margrave of Baden (d. 1533)
 December – Ayşe Hafsa Sultan, Ottoman Valide Sultan (d. 1534)
 date unknown
 Johann Cochlaeus, German humanist and controversialist (d. 1552)
 Vallabhacharya, Indian founder of the Vallabha sect of Hinduism (d. 1531)
 probable – Henry Stafford, 1st Earl of Wiltshire (d. 1522)

Deaths 
 January 18 – Louis IX, Duke of Bavaria (b. 1417)
 January 20 – King John II of Aragon (b. 1397)
 February – Antonello da Messina, Italian painter (b. c. 1430)
 February 10 – Catherine of Cleves, duchess consort regent of Guelders (b. 1417)
 February 12 – Eleanor of Navarre, queen regnant of Navarre (b. 1426)
 April 24 – Jorge Manrique, Spanish poet (b. 1440)
 June 11 – John of Sahagún, Spanish Augustinian friar, priest and saint (b. 1419)
 September 10 – Jacopo Piccolomini-Ammannati, Italian Catholic cardinal (b. 1422)
 September 18 – Fulk Bourchier, 10th Baron FitzWarin, English baron (b. 1445)
 November 6 – James Hamilton, 1st Lord Hamilton
 date unknown
 Johanne Andersdatter Sappi, Danish noble (b. 1400)
 Ólöf Loftsdóttir, politically active Icelandic woman (b. c. 1410)

References